Pensacola High School is a secondary school located near downtown Pensacola, Florida, United States.

The school celebrated its 100th anniversary in 2001 and graduated its 100th class of seniors in 2005; however, the school has not always been at its current location. It was moved to Maxwell Street in 1952. In 1969, a fire gutted the previous school building on Lee Square, prompting its demolition. Currently, it is the oldest secondary school in Pensacola.

The school is part of the Escambia County School District. A former principal, Norm Ross, is the deputy superintendent of schools for the county. Currently, the principal is David Williams, a former NBA player who previously served as Assistant Principal of Grounds and Maintenance.

After Hurricane Ivan, which struck the Pensacola area on September 16, 2004, Pensacola High School was damaged. While large renovations were needed, the school remained open and in operation. The gymnasium, which had only recently been remodeled, was demolished in June 2005. The auditorium was rebuilt in the spring of 2007, and the gymnasium was rebuilt in time for the 2008–2009 school year.

Origins
The first public school for boys in Pensacola was organized in 1870. A two-story building on Wright Street was erected by the School Board in 1875. It was known as the Pensacola Academy and its principal was John Wilmer. In 1886, a new building was erected on Lee Square, known as Public School No. 1. Its first graduating class consisted of Albert Reed and J. Whiting Hyer.

In 1905, Pensacola Senior High School was organized in the Public School No. 1 building. The school was a four-year high school, and its first principal was J. B. Lockey. PHS's first graduating class consisted of Dudley Barrow and Nell Richards.

Pensacola High School is also recognized as having Florida's oldest high school football program, girls basketball program, and school yearbook.

International Baccalaureate
Pensacola High School is the only school in Escambia County to have an International Baccalaureate program. It is an application-based program, typically accepting applications in the fall of a student's 8th, 9th, or 10th grade year.

The International Baccalaureate program was introduced in 1986 and has been a well recognized program since.  IB is a university-preparatory program and is designed to prepare students for admission to and success at prestigious universities.

IB program students must complete rigorous, college-level curriculum in addition to a Community Action Service project, an extended essay, and various other academic and social requirements in order to receive their IB diploma.

PHS IB is the only school in Northwest Florida with National Merit Commended Scholars, Semi-Finalists, and Finalists every year for the past 21 years. In addition, 15 students have been accepted into MIT in the last 16 years. At least one student every year has been accepted into a top Ivy League School

PHS IB is the only school in the county that offers:

 3 years of Chemistry, Biology, and Physics.

 AP BC Calculus & IB Math HL -instrumental in some college acceptance.

PHS is consistently ranked one of the top most challenging schools

Communities served
Most of Pensacola's historic North Hill community, sections of East Hill community, downtown Pensacola and towards Naval Air Station Pensacola, and Pensacola Beach are zoned for Pensacola High School.

Pensacola High School also serves students throughout Northwest Florida through magnet programs and career academies:
International Baccaleaurate Program,
Scholar's Program,
English Language Learner Program,
Academy for Health Professions,
Advanced Manufacturing Academy,
Early Childhood Education Academy,
Law and Public Service Academy, 
Sports Medicine Academy, and Culinary Arts Academy

Even though Pensacola Beach is zoned to Pensacola High School, most high-school students in Pensacola Beach attend Gulf Breeze High School, operated by Santa Rosa County School District.

National recognition and prominence
In the news magazine Newsweek's published list of America's Top Public High Schools, Pensacola High School ranked as follows:

2003 - #188
2005 - #8
2006 - #38
2007 - #38
2008 - #42
2009 - #54

2010 - #22

2016 - The Washington Post named Pensacola High School in the top 10% of the hardest schools in America, ranking it number 35 out of several thousand.

Extracurricular programs

PHS currently features several extracurricular activities that compete in Escambia County, and across the state:

 PHS is home to FL–12 AFJROTC, a large Air Force JROTC unit founded in 1969. FL–12 is one of the first JROTC units in the United States. The FL–12 drill team was founded in 1972, winning titles at the local, region, and national level.
 The Academic Team (quiz bowl) has had the longest win streak in the Cox Academic Tournament. The team has been champions for the previous ten years. The team has competed on the state and national level, with both the team and individual team members placing highly.
 Mu Alpha Theta (Math Team) which attends three regional competitions and the Milton math competition. The Pensacola High School math team consistently has individuals placing in the top ten and teams placing in the top five. It usually also places in the sweepstakes division.
 The PHS drama troupe has been a successful program for many years, competing and winning competitions at the state level.
The Future Business Leaders of America chapter at PHS is one of the largest organizations on campus and is successful at state competitions, with the current state president being a PHS student.
The PHS Health Occupations Students of America student group is competitive at the state level.
 PHS football team has the distinction of being the oldest football program in the state: pro, college or high school. The first game was played in 1905. In 2009 the PHS Football team won the Class 3A State Championship.
 PHS also features a variety of athletic programs: boys' football, baseball, soccer, weightlifting, lacrosse, tennis, swim and dive, track and field, cross country, and golf; and girls' volleyball, basketball, soccer, softball, cross country, track and field, weightlifting, swimming and diving, tennis, golf, lacrosse, and flag football.
 In addition to many athletic programs, PHS also has a student band and cheerleading team, as well as a Student Government Association

Notable alumni

References

External links
 Pensacola High School website
 Escambia School District
GreatSchools Pensacola High School

Educational institutions established in 1901
International Baccalaureate schools in Florida
Escambia County School District
High schools in Escambia County, Florida
Public high schools in Florida
1901 establishments in Florida